This is a list of events held and scheduled by the Maximum Fighting Championship (MFC), a mixed martial arts organization based in Canada.

The first event, MFC 1, took place on March 3, 2001. MFC 29 saw the debut of the MFC outside of Alberta, Canada.

Past events

Event locations 

These cities have hosted the following numbers of MFC events as of MFC: 41

  Canada (44)
 Edmonton, Alberta – 38
 Grande Prairie, Alberta - 2
 Calgary, Alberta - 1
 Lethbridge, Alberta - 1
 Slave Lake, Alberta - 1
 Windsor, Ontario - 1

References

 
Maximum Fighting Championship